Belinda Wright may refer to:
 Belinda Wright (conservationist) (born 1953), wildlife photographer and wildlife conservationist in India
 Belinda Wright (softball) (born 1980), softball player from Australia
 Belinda Wright (dancer) (1929–2007), English ballerina